P. cavernicola may refer to:
 Pachyseius cavernicola, a mite species
 Pilea cavernicola, a herbaceous plant species native to China
 Polystichum cavernicola, a fern known only from a limestone cave in China

See also 
 Cavernicola (disambiguation)